The 1892–93 season was the first in the history of the Bristol & District League, which was renamed the Western League in 1895. Nine clubs formed the new league, which consisted of a single division. Wells City joined the league from the Somerset Senior League, of which they had been champions twice. Warmley were the first champions of the new league.

Final table

Results

See also
1892–93 Eastville Rovers F.C. season

References

1892-93
1892–93 in English association football leagues